Jonathan Goddard (born 21 June 1982) is an English former professional rugby league footballer.

He played for amateur clubs Smawthorne Panthers and Castleford Panthers before playing for Castleford Tigers, Oldham, Hull Kingston Rovers and Halifax RLFC.

He signed for Hull Kingston Rovers in November 2005, he was released by Hull Kingston Rovers on 17 September 2007, but he was quickly signed up by Halifax. In September 2009, he was re-signed by Halifax to a 2-year contract until the end of 2011. He retired in 2011 due to injury problems.

In April 2014, Goddard signed as a fitness instructor for Doncaster's health club Eco Fitness. He later signed with Penryn RFC in May 2016 as fitness coach.

Background
Jonathan Goddard was born in Pontefract, West Yorkshire, England.

References

1982 births
Living people
Castleford Tigers players
English rugby league players
Halifax R.L.F.C. players
Hull Kingston Rovers players
Oldham R.L.F.C. players
Rugby league centres
Rugby league fullbacks
Rugby league players from Pontefract